The Laser World Championship was held in Split, Croatia between 12–19 September 2017.

Results

Gold fleet

Silver fleet

Bronze fleet

References

Laser World Championships
Laser World Championship
Sailing competitions in Croatia
2017 in Croatian sport